Alok Bhattacharya (born 1951) is an Indian parasitologist, academic and a professor at the School of Life Sciences of the Jawaharlal Nehru University. He chairs the Biotechnology Information System Network (BITSNET) as well as the Life Sciences Expert Committee of FIST program of the Department of Science and Technology (DST). He is an elected fellow of the Indian Academy of Sciences and the Indian National Science Academy and is known for his studies on Entamoeba histolytica and species-specific calcium binding protein and its gene.

The Council of Scientific and Industrial Research, the apex agency of the Government of India for scientific research, awarded him the Shanti Swarup Bhatnagar Prize for Science and Technology, one of the highest Indian science awards, in 1994, for his contributions to biological sciences.

Biography 
Alok Bhattacharya, born on 2 February 1951, did his graduate studies in science at Hansraj College of the University of Delhi and obtained a master's degree in chemistry from the Indian Institute of Technology, Kanpur in 1972. Subsequently, he did his doctoral research at the School of Life Sciences, Jawaharlal Nehru University (JNU) under the guidance of Asis Datta, a renowned geneticist and Padma Bhushan laureate, to secure a PhD in 1976. He moved to the US for his post-doctoral studies which he did at the Laboratory of Pathophysiology of National Cancer Institute during 1977–79 and at the Springer Lab of Harvard Medical School from 1979 to 1981. Returning to India the same year, he joined the All India Institute of Medical Sciences Delhi and worked there as a senior research officer at the Department of Biochemistry till 1982 when he joined Tata Research Development and Design Centre of the Tata Consultancy Services located in Pune, where he worked till 1985. In 1986, Bhattacharya had a short stint at the Laboratory of Parasitic Diseases of the National Institutes of Health as a guest researcher, after which he joined his alma mater, Jawaharlal Nehru University, as an associate professor at their School of Life Sciences, where he is the incumbent professor and adjunct faculty. During his service at JNU, he held various positions, including that of the coordinator of Bioinformatics Centre (1998–2008), dean of School of Life Sciences (2002–2004) and the dean of School of Information Technology (2004–2008). He is also a professor of life sciences at Shiv Nadar University, Dadri and a visiting faculty at Banaras Hindu University.

Alok Bhattacharya is married to Sudha Bhattacharya, a known parasitologist. She is a professor at Jawaharlal Nehru University and is a co-author of some of his publications. The couple lives in Delhi.

Legacy 

Bhattacharya's researches were focused on parasitology, computation biology and bioinformatics, with special focus on the biology of Entamoeba histolytica, an anaerobic parasitic protozoan causing amoebiasis. His studies elucidated the molecular mechanisms during the opsonization process of the pathogen and identified new proteins such as EhCaBP1, EhCaBP3 and EhC2PK which play a role in the phagocytosis and actin dynamics of the parasite. His team developed new genomic tools and also proposed new algorithms for the identification of genomic variations. His work on lipophosphoglycan and its identification and characterization as well as on the species-specific calcium binding protein and its gene are reported to have been pioneering. These studies are known to have widened the understanding of the pathogenesis of the protozoan at the molecular level. For pursuing his researches on Entamoeba histolytica, he founded a dedicated laboratory at JNU. He has also worked on the pathogenesis of malaria and visceral leishmaniasis (kala-azar) and his researches are documented in a number of articles of which 188 have been listed by ResearchGate, an online repository of scientific articles.

Bhattacharya is associated with the Department of Science and Technology (DST) and is the chairman of two of DST's initiatives. Biotechnology Information System Network, a bioinformatics program for establishing a centralised database and nationwide network of affiliated organizations is one while the other is Fund for Improvement of S&T Infrastructure in Universities and other Higher Educational Institutions (FIST) where he heads the Expert Committee on Life Sciences. He is a member of Guha Research Conference and a former vice president of the Indian National Science Academy (2011–13). He serves as a member of the governing council of the Council of Scientific and Industrial Research (CSIR), as a member of CSIR Society and as a member of the research councils of Institute of Himalayan Bioresource Technology and Central Salt and Marine Chemicals Research Institute, both constituent laboratories of CSIR. He sits in the USER committee of the Department of Science and Technology and chairs the Task force on Bioinformatics, Computation Biology and Systems Biology of the Department of Biotechnology. He is the managing trustee of GNE-Myopathy International, a forum of patients who suffer from GNE-Myopathy, a genetic disorder affecting young people and is associated with several science journals including Parasitology International, Journal of Biosciences, Genome Analysis, Bioinformatics: From Molecules to systems, International Journal of Integrative Biology, PLoS Neglected Tropical Diseases and Nature.

Bhattacharya is a former vice president (2009–10) of the Society of Biological Chemists (India), a science society based at the Indian Institute of Science, serves as a member for internal expert panel of the Council of Indian Institutes of Technology and is involved with the Project AMOEBAC of the Infect-ERA, a global organization for researches on human infectious diseases. He has delivered several guest lectures and keynote addresses and is a member of the Scientific Advisory Committee of the National Symposium on Bioinformatics and Computational Systems Biology organized by the National Network for Mathematical and Computational Biology (NNMCB) of the Department of Science and Technology to be held during 12–14 November 2016 at Central University of Himachal Pradesh. He has also mentored research scholars in their doctoral researches.

Awards and honors 
Bhattacharya, a Robert McNamara Fellow of the World Bank (1985–86), was awarded the Shanti Swarup Bhatnagar Prize, one of the highest Indian science awards, by the Council of Scientific and Industrial Research in 1994. He is also a recipient of Science Exhibition Award of Delhi University in 1968 and 1969 and the Rockefeller Biotechnology Career Development Award for 1988–1990. He is a J.C. Bose National Fellow of the Department of Science and Technology, India and an elected fellow of the Indian National Science Academy and the Indian Academy of Sciences. He received the Aryabhatta Medal of the Indian National Science Academy in 2015.

Selected bibliography

See also 

 Sudha Bhattacharya
 Veena Tandon
 Hereditary inclusion body myopathy
 Entamoeba histolytica
 Asis Datta

References

External links

Further reading 
 

Recipients of the Shanti Swarup Bhatnagar Award in Biological Science
1951 births
Scientists from Delhi
Delhi University alumni
IIT Kanpur alumni
Jawaharlal Nehru University alumni
Academic staff of Jawaharlal Nehru University
National Institutes of Health people
Harvard Medical School alumni
Tata Consultancy Services people
Indian parasitologists
Indian scientific authors
Council of Scientific and Industrial Research
Fellows of the Indian Academy of Sciences
Fellows of the Indian National Science Academy
All India Institute of Medical Sciences, New Delhi alumni
Academic staff of Banaras Hindu University
Living people
20th-century Indian biologists